Diane Atnally Conlin (born 1963) is an American classicist and archaeologist specializing in the art in architecture of ancient Rome. She is an associate professor at the University of Colorado Boulder and directs its excavations at the Villa of Maxentius.

Career and research 
Conlin obtained a PhD in art history and classics from the University of Michigan in 1993. She is currently associate professor of art history and classics at the University of Colorado Boulder, where she has received the Boulder Faculty Assembly Excellence in Teaching Award, and was named a President's Teaching Scholar in 2008. She is also a member of the American Academy in Rome.

Conlin specializes in the art, architecture and archaeology of ancient Rome, particularly in the imperial period. Her work includes studies of Roman relief sculpture and marble carving analysis. She is the co-director of the University of Colorado’s excavations at the Villa of Maxentius, on the Via Appia near Rome.

Selected publications 

Political Art in Flavian Rome, 2017

References

External links 

 University of Colorado Boulder
 Archaeological Institute of America

1963 births
American archaeologists
American art historians
American women archaeologists
Women art historians
Classical archaeologists
University of Michigan alumni
University of Colorado Boulder faculty
Living people
21st-century American women